Marie Amélie, Duchess of Ratibor, Princess of Corvey, Princess of Hohenlohe-Schillingsfürst (née Princess Amélie of Fürstenberg; 12 February 1821 – 17 January 1899), was the consort of Victor I, Duke of Ratibor.

Biography 
Princess Amelie of Fürstenberg was born on 12 February 1821 in Donaueschingen as the third child of Charles Egon II, Prince of Fürstenberg, and Princess Amalie of Baden.

On 19 April 1845 she married Victor I, Duke of Ratibor, at Donaueschingen. They had ten children:

 Princess Amelia of Hohenlohe-Schillingsfürst (3 October 1846 – 25 August 1847)
 Viktor II, Duke of Ratibor (6 September 1847 – 9 August 1923); married in 1867 Countess Maria Breunner-Enkevoirth, had issue.
 Prince Franz of Hohenlohe-Schillingsfürst (6 April 1849 – 27 May 1925)
 Princess Elisabeth of Hohenlohe-Schillingsfürst (27 February 1851 – 5 October 1928)
 Prince Egon of Hohenlohe-Schillingsfürst (4 January 1853 – 10 February 1896); married in 1885 Princess Leopoldine of Lobkowicz, had issue.
 Princess Marie of Hohenlohe-Schillingsfürst (27 June 1854 – 29 May 1928)
 Prince Maximilian of Hohenlohe-Schillingsfürst (9 February 1856 – 12 January 1924); married in 1882 Countess Franziska Grimaud  d'Orsay, had issue.
 Prince Ernst of Hohenlohe-Schillingsfürst (10 Nov 1857 – 25 February 1891)
 Prince Karl Egon of Hohenlohe-Schillingsfürst (7 July 1860 – 4 June 1940)
 Princess Margaret of Hohenlohe-Schillingsfürst (3 June 1863 – 4 June 1940)

She died on 17 January 1899 at Schloss Rauden.

References

1821 births
1899 deaths
19th-century German women
Fürstenberg (princely family)
House of Hohenlohe
German princesses
German duchesses
People from Donaueschingen